Domaine du Closel – Château des Vaults is a family-run, organic winery and vineyard, located in Savennières in the Loire Valley of France. The small village is situated on the north bank of the river Loire about 11 miles southwest of the city of Angers.

History
Domaine du Closel – Château des Vaults, one of the largest producers in Savennières, has been producing wine since 1495. In the beginning of the 20th century Marque de Las Cases, a descendant of Napoleon's official biographer, Count de Las Cases, inherited the estate, which is home to the Château des Vaults, the wine making facilities and 16 hectares of vines. The name Château des Vaults dates back to the middle ages. In old French, vault meant valley and thus the name refers to the small valleys in which the château and the vineyards are located. The name Domaine du Closel was added more recently to pay homage to Bernard du Closel, who was Mayor of Savennières from 1916 to 1956 and founder of the Savennières wine growing appellation in 1952. Bernard du Closel was the husband of Marque de Las Cases. Since Marque de Las Cases and Bernard du Closel had no children, they transferred the estate to their niece, Michèle de Jessey. In 2001 Michèle de Jessey retired and her daughter, Evelyne de Pontbriand, took over the management and wine making responsibilities.

References

External links
  Domaine du Closel website

Wineries of France